South Main Street Commercial Historic District may refer to:

South Main Street Commercial Historic District (Little Rock, Arkansas)
South Main Street Commercial Historic District (Pendleton, Oregon), listed on the National Register of Historic Places

See also
South Main Street Historic District (disambiguation)